Whitefarland is a clachan on the Isle of Arran in the Firth of Clyde, Scotland.

External links

Canmore - Arran, High Whitefarland site record
Canmore - Arran, Whitefarland Cemetery site record

Villages in the Isle of Arran